New Jersey's 19th Legislative District is one of 40 in the New Jersey Legislature. As of the 2011 apportionment, the district includes the Middlesex County municipalities of Carteret, Perth Amboy, Sayreville, South Amboy and Woodbridge Township.

Demographic characteristics
As of the 2020 United States census, the district had a population of 239,157, of whom 186,467 (78.0%) were of voting age. The racial makeup of the district was 91,092 (38.1%) White, 26,240 (11.0%) African American, 1,555 (0.7%) Native American, 42,125 (17.6%) Asian, 95 (0.0%) Pacific Islander, 47,945 (20.0%) from some other race, and 30,105 (12.6%) from two or more races. Hispanic or Latino of any race were 87,729 (36.7%) of the population. 

The district had 155,334 registered voters as of December 1, 2021, of whom 60,854 (39.2%) were registered as unaffiliated, 69,040 (44.4%) were registered as Democrats, 22,878 (14.7%) were registered as Republicans, and 2,562 (1.7%) were registered to other parties.

The district has a higher-than-average percentage of Asian American and Hispanic residents. Registered Democrats outnumber Republicans by a nearly 4 to 1 margin, with Republican registration percentage one of the lowest of any district statewide.

Political representation
For the 2022–2023 session, the district is represented in the State Senate by Joe F. Vitale (D, Woodbridge Township) and in the General Assembly by Craig Coughlin (D, Woodbridge Township) and Yvonne Lopez (D, Perth Amboy).

The legislative district is entirely located within New Jersey's 6th congressional district.

Apportionment history
Throughout the history of the 19th District since its creation in 1973 coinciding with the first drawing of the 40-district legislative map, the municipalities that make up the district has been relatively unchanged. In all maps, Perth Amboy, Sayreville, South Amboy, and Woodbridge have been a part of the district. The 1973 version of the district solely included those four municipalities. In the 1981 redistricting, South River was added to the district. Following the 1991 redistricting, South River was removed and Carteret was added. Since the 1991 redistricting, no changes have been made to the boundaries of the district, including after the redistricting in 2001, based on the results of the 2000 United States Census and the 2011 redistricting.

In the 1977 Democratic primaries, Laurence S. Weiss defeated incumbent senator John J. Fay Jr., and went on to win election. Alan Karcher chose to run for the Democratic nomination for Governor of New Jersey in 1989, and was replaced in the Assembly by future Governor Jim McGreevey.

Having first been elected to the Assembly in 1973, George Otlowski lost a three-way race for the two Assembly seats in the 1991 primary election. In the statewide Republican landslide in the 1991 general election, Weiss lost his Senate seat to Randy Corman, while in the Assembly Stephen A. Mikulak and Ernest L. Oros defeated Democratic candidates Thomas J. Deverin and Jay Ziznewski, putting Republicans in all three legislative seats in what had been described by The New York Times as a "blue-collar and traditionally rock-solid Democratic district".

In the 1993 race, Jim McGreevey won the Senate seat back for the Democrats over Randy Corman, with Republican incumbents Mikulak and Oros hanging on to their seats in the Assembly. Democrats statewide saw a net gain of three seats in the Assembly in the 1995 elections, with two of the pickups coming in the 19th District where Arline Friscia and John Wisniewski knocked off the Republican incumbents Mikulak and Oros.

McGreevey stepped down from his Senate seat in 1997 to run for Governor of New Jersey and was replaced by Joe Vitale. After McGreevey's narrow loss to Republican Christine Todd Whitman, The Record reported speculation that Vitale would step down from the Senate and McGreevey would be named to the Senate seat, a rumor that McGreevey dismissed.

In the 2003 Democratic primary, Friscia lost the official endorsement of the Middlesex County Democratic Organization, which went instead to Perth Amboy mayor Joseph Vas. Friscia objected to being knocked off the party line, stating that "a history of women being knocked off tickets in Middlesex County" exists as "part of a long sad history of the Democratic Party disenfranchising qualified women". She lost in the June 2003 Democratic primary election to Vas and announced her party switch on August 5, 2003. In a similar situation to what happened with 17th District Assemblywoman Angela L. Perun in 1985, Republicans Frisca and running mate Jeffrey Pino were defeated by Vas and Wisniewski in the 2003 general election.

On September 8, 2009, a special convention of Middlesex County Democratic Committee members selected Craig Coughlin to appear on the general election ballot along with incumbent Wisniewski, and the two Democrats went on to win in the November general election.

Election history

Election results

Senate

General Assembly

References

Middlesex County, New Jersey
19